Florian Rousseau (born 3 February 1974 in Orléans) is a former French track cyclist who won three gold medals and one silver at the Summer Olympics (1996 and 2000). He was popular among spectators for the facial expressions he pulled - many of them seeming to make his eyes bulge - to help him concentrate at the start of races. In retirement he became one of France's national sprint coaches.

Youth
Rousseau spent much of his childhood and went to school in Patay. He began as a soccer player but, seeing no future in team sports, switched to cycling. He showed early talent on the track and joined the national sports institute, INSEP, in western Paris in 1990. He won the world junior kilometre championship in 1992 and the world senior championship in 1993 and 1994.

Career
Florian Rousseau's win in the 1996 Olympic Games in Atlanta, United States, started a golden period for French track cycling that lasted four years. He won the kilometre at Atlanta but dropped the discipline to become a sprinter. He was trained by Gérard Quintyn and won the world sprint championship in 1996 to 1998. He won three Olympic gold medals and a silver. He was world team sprint champion in 1997 and 1998 and won the national sprint championship 17 times.

Management
Florian Rousseau was the national sprint coach at INSEP, in western Paris. He resigned shortly after the 2013 Cycling World Championships in Minsk

Rousseau was appointed as the inaugural president of the UCI Athletes' Commission in 2011.

Outside cycling
Rousseau is married to Sonia, and a scuba-diver in his spare time, particularly in the Caribbean and off Australia.

Major results

1992
1st Kilo, World Championships - Junior
3rd Sprint, French National Track Championships - Junior

1993
1st Kilo, World Championships
1st Kilo, French National Track Championships

1994
1st Kilo, World Championships
1st Kilo, French National Track Championships
UCI Track Cycling World Cup Classics champion

1995
2nd Kilo, World Championships
2nd Sprint, World Championships
1st Kilo, French National Track Championships
1st Sprint, French National Track Championships

1996
1st Kilo, Olympic Games
1st Sprint, World Championships
3rd world team sprint championship
1st Kilo, Sprint, French National Track Championships
1st Sprint, French National Track Championships

1997
1st Sprint, World Championships
1st Team sprint, World Championships
1st Sprint, French National Track Championships

1998
1st Sprint, World Championships
1st Team sprint, World Championships
1st Sprint, French National Track Championships
1st Keirin, French National Track Championships

1999
1st Team sprint, World Championships
3rd Sprint, World Championships

2000
1st Keirin, Olympic Games
1st Team sprint, Olympic Games
2nd Sprint, Olympic Games
1st Team sprint, World Championships
1st Sprint, French National Track Championships

2001
1st Team sprint, World Championships
3rd Sprint, World Championships
2nd Sprint, French National Track Championships
3rd Keirin, French National Track Championships

2002
3rd Sprint, World Championships
3rd Sprint, French National Track Championships

References

External links 
 
 

1974 births
Living people
French male cyclists
French cycling coaches
Cyclists at the 1996 Summer Olympics
Cyclists at the 2000 Summer Olympics
Olympic cyclists of France
Olympic gold medalists for France
Olympic silver medalists for France
Olympic medalists in cycling
Sportspeople from Nogent-sur-Marne
UCI Track Cycling World Champions (men)
Sportspeople from Orléans
Medalists at the 2000 Summer Olympics
Medalists at the 1996 Summer Olympics
French track cyclists
Cyclists from Île-de-France
Cyclists from Centre-Val de Loire